Surveillance is the ninth studio album by Canadian hard rock band Triumph, released July 27, 1987 (see 1987 in music). The album was recorded at Metalworks Studios, Mississauga, Ontario, Canada.  This is the last Triumph album to feature Rik Emmett until his return to the band in 2008.

A different version of the song "Running In The Night" would surface on Signal's 1989 album, Loud & Clear, re-titled "Go" and credited solely to Mark Baker and Erik Scott.

Track listing

Personnel
 Rik Emmett – guitars, synthesizers, lead vocals, Synclavier II, Fairlight CMI Series III programming
 Gil Moore – drums, percussion, vocals
 Michael Levine – bass guitar, keyboards, synthesizers, Emulator II

Additional musicians
 John Roberts – newscast on "Carry on the Flame"
 Steve Morse – acoustic guitars on "All the King's Horses" and Lead electric guitars on "Headed for Nowhere"
 Dave Tkaczuk – synthesizer, keyboards, programming
 Greg Loates – percussion, programming, effects, producer
 Hugh Cooper – sound effects, research, engineer
 Joel Feeney – backing vocals
 Joel Wade – backing vocals, chant, choir, chorus
 Paul Henderson – backing vocals, chant, choir, chorus
 Ross Munro – choir, chorus, chant
 John Alexander – choir, chorus, chant
 Noel Golden – choir, chorus, chant

Production
 Thom Trumbo – producer
 Ed Stone – mixing
 Bill Kennedy – engineer
 Christopher Pritchard – assistant engineer
 Bob Ludwig – mastering
 Brett Zilahi – digital remastering
 Alex Andronache – studio coordinator
 Dave Dickson – technical consultant
 Dean Motter – illustrations, cover art
 Louie Mann – art direction, concept, design
 Adamoff – cover art concept

Charts

Certifications

Release history

References

External links
Surveillance Entry At Official Triumph Homepage
Info At Fan Site

1987 albums
Triumph (band) albums
MCA Records albums
Albums recorded at Metalworks Studios